The Magenta–Crocco elevator is a public elevator in  the Castelletto quarter of Genoa, in Northwestern Italy. It constitutes the continuation of the Sant'Anna funicular, linking Corso Magenta with via Antonio Crocco.

The elevator can be reached from Corso Magenta through a pedestrian tunnel, from which it also possible to reach a small private elevator connecting the tunnel to the Old Pharmacy of the Sant'Anna Convent. The elevator can also be reached from a second entrance located in via Acquarone.

It entered service in 1933. In 1966, it came under the responsibility of AMT Genova. In 2007, it underwent a complete maintenance review and the substitution of the old cars with modern ones.

History 
The construction of the elevator started in 1929 and was conducted by Istituto Edile Immobiliare Genovese, the land developer which had undertaken the urbanization of via Antonio Crocco and salita Santa Maria della Sanità. The building company, however, did not want to take accountability for the operation of the elevator and sold it to the Municipality in 1933. In 1947, the Municipality contracted the operation of the elevator to a private operator, the Società Anonima Funicolare Genovese, which also run the nearby Sant'Anna funicular. In 1956 the Municipality took  control again of the operation. In 1966 the accountability passed to the Municipal transport company AMT Genova, which renovated the elevator in 1982, 1989 and 2007.

Operation 
 Rise: 49 metri 
 Cars = 2 
 Capacity: 30 people per car  
 Speed: 1,8 m/s
 Time: 40 secondi
 Type: STIGLER
 Engine power: 37 kW
 VVVF (inverter)

References

Bibliography 
 Corrado Bozzano, Roberto Pastore e Claudio Serra, Genova in salita, Nuova Editrice Genovese, Genova, 2014, pp. 169–171, 
 Giampiero Orselli e Patrizia Traverso, Ascensore Corso Magenta-Via Crocco, in Genova che scende e che sale, Il Canneto, Genova, 2015, pp. 201–202, .

See also 
 Sant'Anna funicular
 Sant'Anna, Genoa
 Castelletto

External links 
 AMT Page
Brochure on all lifts, funicular & rack railways in Genoa

Other projects 

Transport in Genoa